The Elementary Teachers' Federation of Ontario (ETFO; , FEÉO) is a labour union representing all public elementary school teachers, occasional teachers, and some designated early childhood educators (DECEs) in the Canadian province of Ontario. The union has 76 local chapters in the province, and over 83,000 members. The union was founded on July 1, 1998, by the merger of the Federation of Women Teachers' Associations of Ontario (FWTAO) and the Ontario Public School Teachers' Federation (OPSTF).

ETFO's 83,000 members join the Association des enseignantes et des enseignants franco-ontariens (representing approximately 8,000 members), the Ontario English Catholic Teachers' Association (representing approximately 45,000 members) and the Ontario Secondary School Teachers' Federation (representing approximately 60,000 members) to form the Ontario Teachers' Federation. ETFO is also a member of the Canadian Teachers' Federation.

Governance

The governance framework is outlined in a number of different documents including the Bylaws, Constitution, Human Rights Statement, Policy Statements, Position Statements, and Equity Statement. These documents form the framework for how ETFO is governed and what it sets out to accomplish for its members.

Provincial Presidents

Karen Brown

Toronto teacher Karen Brown was elected president of the Elementary Teachers’ Federation of Ontario in 2021. Brown has served as ETFO first vice-president since 2015 and was first elected to the provincial Executive in 2009. Brown is the first Black president to be elected to a provincial teacher affiliate union in Ontario and the first known Black president to be elected to a provincial teacher affiliate union in Canada.

Provincial Executive

ETFO's provincial organization includes four fully released officers: President, First Vice-President, Vice-President Female and Vice-President. All four of these officers are ETFO members (teachers, occasional teachers, DECEs or other educational professionals) that have been released from their teaching duties for their term in office.

In addition to the 4 released officers, ETFO's provincial governing body includes one representative to the Ontario Teachers' Federation (OTF Table Officer), and as many additional officers required to make up the 14-member Executive. Of those remaining positions, 4 of them are open to women only.

All Provincial Executive positions are elected by the general membership at ETFO's Annual Meeting held each summer in August. All terms last 2 years.

Executive, 2021–2023

Non-elected positions

ETFO locals

Each school board in Ontario has at least 1 ETFO Local serving members who work within that school board. Teacher Locals are present in all school boards, 1 Local (James Bay) has only a Teacher Local, 10 boards have DECE (Dedicated Early Childhood Educator) Locals, and 2 boards have ESP and one of those 2 (Renfrew County) also has a PSP Local.

The objectives and priorities of ETFO are contained in the constitution:

While all boards now have DECEs as a result of the implementation of Full Day Kindergarten for children aged 4 – 6, not all of those educators are represented by ETFO.

Advocacy and equity

ETFO has been seen as a leader among teachers' federations on equity issues. With 80%+ female members, ETFO is particularly active in its support for women's participation and leadership.

The ETFO Executive has adopted this definition of equity:

See also

 Education in Ontario

References

External links 
 

Trade unions in Ontario
Education trade unions
Educational organizations based in Ontario
Trade unions established in 1998